The Clwydian Range (also known as the Clwydian Hills; or simply the Clwyds) is a series of hills in the north-east of Wales that runs from Llandegla in the south to Prestatyn in the north; the highest point is  Moel Famau. The range forms the north-western part of the Clwydian Range and Dee Valley Area of Outstanding Natural Beauty.

Geology 

The Clwydian Hills are formed from an upstanding block of deep sea sediments formed during the Silurian period as debris slurries originating on the nearby continental shelf. The older mudstones and siltstones of the Nantglyn Flags Formation form parts of the west-facing scarp slope and the overlying Elwy Formation, which consists of mudstones and siltstones deposited in deep marine conditions with numerous sandstone beds, forms most of the higher ground. Both formations are of Ludlovian age.  The range's rocks are intensely faulted; the major Vale of Clwyd Fault is responsible for the impressive west-facing scarp of the Clwydian Range. It downthrows the rocks to the west and separates the younger Carboniferous and Permo-Triassic rocks of the Vale of Clwyd from those of the hills.

Ice from the Welsh ice-sheet moved eastwards over the Clwydian Hills during the last ice age, impinging on the Irish Sea Ice to the east of the range. Numerous glacial meltwater channels occur around the range whilst the valley of the River Wheeler which cuts the range in two was a significant drainage channel.

Geography
The hills in the Clwydian Range provide extensive views across northern Wales, to the high peaks of Snowdonia, eastwards across the Cheshire Plain to the Peak District, and towards Manchester and Liverpool in England to the northeast. The Offa's Dyke National Trail traverses the range's high ground from Llandegla to Prestatyn.

The hills, which are mainly heather-clad upland above pastures, have several Iron Age hillforts including Y Foel (Moel Hiraddug),  Moel-y-gaer, Penycloddiau, Moel Arthur, a second Moel y Gaer and Foel Fenlli. There are several tumuli and cairns on the hills.

Summits

Area of Outstanding Natural Beauty

The Clwydian Range was designated as an Area of Outstanding Natural Beauty in 1985, one of only five in Wales.

A wide range of wildlife thrives in the range, including red kites and red foxes, which both prey on rabbits and voles. There is also one of the few Welsh populations of black grouse and there is a project to conserve the European water vole, which is suffering a large decline in numbers across the United Kingdom. Another project is trying to get rid of the non-native Himalayan balsam which has invaded the Alyn Valley area.

Recreation 
The Offa's Dyke Path follows the Clwydian Range, although Offa's Dyke itself was not constructed on it. The Clwydian Way long distance footpath passes through the Clwydian Range, and the North Wales Path follows the foot of the scarp between Prestatyn and Dyserth.

References

External links 
 Clwydian Range and Dee Valley AONB
 Clwydian Range Tourism Group

Areas of Outstanding Natural Beauty in Wales
Mountains and hills of Flintshire
Mountains and hills of Denbighshire